Let It Loose is the tenth studio album by Gloria Estefan and Miami Sound Machine, released in 1987. It is the first studio album to feature a specific credit for Estefan, but is her 10th album overall including her work with Miami Sound Machine. Initially gaining little attention in Europe, the success of the single Anything for You led to the album being re-released under that name, and with a different cover art, across Europe, South Africa, Australia and New Zealand from October 1988 to early 1989. It became Miami Sound Machine's most commercially successful album, being certified triple-platinum by the RIAA and peaking at number six on the Billboard 200.

Track listing

Personnel

Gloria Estefan –  lead and backing vocals
John De Faria –  all guitars
Clay Ostwald, Jim Trompeter –  keyboards
Jorge Casas, Will Lee –  bass
Emilio Estefan, Rafael Padilla –  percussion
Enrique Berro "Kiki" Garcia –  drums
Randy Barlow, Teddy Mulett –  trumpet
Clarence Clemons –  sax solos on track 2
Ed Calle –  saxophone
Paquito Hechavarría –  piano solos on tracks 5 & 7

Production
Emilio Estefan – producer
Lawrence Dermer – producer
Rafael Vigil – producer
Jorge Casa  – producer (track 6)
Clay Ostwald  – producer (track 6)
John Haag – engineer
Teresa Verplanck – engineer
Eric Schilling – mixing

Chart positions

Year-end charts

Certifications

Release history

Let It Loose

Anything For You

References

External links

1987 albums
Miami Sound Machine albums
Gloria Estefan albums
Albums produced by Emilio Estefan
Epic Records albums